Koenigia mollis is a species of flowering plant in the family Polygonaceae, native to the eastern Himalayas and Myanmar.

References

Polygonoideae
Flora of East Himalaya
Flora of Myanmar
Plants described in 1825